The Ashland School District (#5) is a public school district that serves the city of Ashland, Oregon, United States.  As of 2009, there were approximately 3,000 students and 300 employees in the district.

Administration
 Superintendent:  Samuel Bogdanove

Primary schools 
 Bellview Elementary School
 Helman Elementary School
 Walker Elementary School

Secondary schools 
Ashland's secondary schools include grades 6 through 8.

Ashland Middle School 

Ashland Middle School is the only public middle school located in Ashland, and has 623 students and 81 staff members. The school includes grades 6-8. The 2012 Oregon Report Card from the Oregon Department of Education rated Ashland Middle School as "outstanding".

In 2013, at 11:06 am, May 14, a fire broke out in the south wing of the school. Smoke was reported to be coming from the boys' bathroom. Investigators said an arsonist had started the fire. The school was cleared by 12:45, and students were let back into the north building. The student who started the fire was identified, and the Jackson County District Attorney's Office Juvenile Department handled the case.

In November 2014, an epidemic of chickenpox broke out at Ashland Middle School. 20 students were reported to have chickenpox, including two cases of pertussis. Only about 70% of students attending Ashland Middle School were vaccinated as of 2013.

High schools
 Ashland High School

Alternative schools 
 John Muir School (K-8)
 Wilderness Charter School
 Willow Wind Community Learning Center

Demographics
In the 2009 school year, the district had 62 students classified as homeless by the Department of Education, which was 2.1% of students in the district.

Teacher and student numbers
 Total students: 3,040
 Classroom teachers: 150.8 (FTE)
 Student/teacher ratio: 20.2

Drug testing controversy

In late 2001, Ashland School Board enacted a controversial drug and alcohol policy for leadership students. The local Oregon chapter of the American Civil Liberties Union had advocated on behalf of various students expelled by the Ashland School District for drug use in May 2001 at a national forensics tournament, and rallied again to protect the students from an unconstitutional invasion of their privacy.  This landmark battle for students' rights was the first of many similar incidents across the country.

Students at Ashland High School argued that their off-campus behavior after school hours should have no effect on their academic standing. In a statement to the local press, Ashland High School Student Body Co-President Brady Brim-DeForest said, "Teaching kids not to use and abuse drugs and alcohol is a family thing. Ultimately, it's a student's own personal choice."

Eventually, the code of conduct was rewritten and the controversy led to a full-scale re-evaluation of the school district's drug and alcohol policy.  In order to reach consensus, a community committee was formed, which met consecutively for five months.

Drug policy references
Daily Tidings (February 2002 coverage)
Daily Tidings (January 2002 coverage)
Daily Tidings (January 2002 coverage)
Daily Tidings (January 2002 coverage)
Daily Tidings (January 2002 coverage)
Mail Tribune (January 2002 coverage)
Mail Tribune (October 2001 coverage) article 1
Mail Tribune (October 2001 coverage) article 2
Daily Tidings (September 2001 coverage)
Mail Tribune (September 2001 coverage)
Mail Tribune (July 2001 coverage) article 1
Mail Tribune (July 2001 coverage) article 2

See also
 List of school districts in Oregon

References

External links
 Ashland School District (official website)

Ashland, Oregon
School districts in Oregon
Education in Jackson County, Oregon